Mohamed Sharaf El-Din Amin (born 6 November 1999) is a Sudanese footballer who currently plays as a left-back for Motala.

Career statistics

Club

Notes

International

References

External links

1999 births
Living people
Sudanese footballers
Sudan international footballers
Association football defenders
Division 2 (Swedish football) players
Norrby IF players
Motala AIF players
2021 Africa Cup of Nations players